John Brian Patrick Quinn,  (January 29, 1943 – November 23, 2014) was a Canadian ice hockey player, head coach, and executive.  Known by the nickname "The Big Irishman", he coached for the National Hockey League's Philadelphia Flyers, Los Angeles Kings, Vancouver Canucks, Toronto Maple Leafs, and Edmonton Oilers, reaching the Stanley Cup Finals twice, with the Flyers in 1980 and the Canucks in 1994.  Internationally, Quinn coached Team Canada to gold medals at the 2002 Winter Olympics, 2008 IIHF World U18 Championships and 2009 World Junior Championship, as well as World Cup championship in 2004.

Prior to coaching, Quinn was an NHL defenceman, having played nine seasons in the league with the Maple Leafs, Canucks and Atlanta Flames.  Coming out of the junior ranks with the Edmonton Oil Kings, he won a Memorial Cup with the club in 1963.  He later won another Memorial Cup as part-owner of the Vancouver Giants in 2007.

Playing career
Quinn began his junior career with the Hamilton Tiger Cubs and Hamilton Kilty B's in the Ontario Hockey Association (OHA).  After graduating high school, Quinn accepted a scholarship from Michigan Tech, but was declared ineligible to play by the NCAA because he had already signed his rights to the Detroit Red Wings.  He instead joined the Edmonton Oil Kings of the Central Alberta Hockey League (CAHL), helping the club to the 1963 Memorial Cup in his only year with Edmonton, playing alongside fellow future NHL player, coach, and manager Glen Sather.

Quinn turned pro in 1963–64 and began stints in several minor leagues, including the Eastern Hockey League (EHL), Central Hockey League (CHL) and Western Hockey League (WHL).  While playing with the Tulsa Oilers, Quinn was called up by the Toronto Maple Leafs in 1968, making his NHL debut.  During his rookie season with the Maple Leafs, he is probably best remembered for an open-ice bodycheck on Bobby Orr in the 1969 playoffs against the Boston Bruins that left Orr unconscious and provoked a bench-clearing brawl.

After two seasons with the Maple Leafs, the Vancouver Canucks claimed Quinn in the 1970 NHL Expansion Draft. He played two seasons in Vancouver, before being again left unprotected in the 1972 NHL Expansion Draft, where he was claimed by the Atlanta Flames and served as team captain.  Quinn retired prematurely in 1977 after suffering an ankle injury.

Management and coaching

Philadelphia Flyers
Quinn became an assistant coach for the Philadelphia Flyers in 1977 under Fred Shero, and was named head coach of the Flyers' American Hockey League (AHL) affiliate, the Maine Mariners, the following season. Quinn returned to the Flyers late that season, however, as head coach of the NHL club (with prior head coach Bob McCammon going back to Maine), and during the 1979–80 NHL season (his first full season with the Flyers) Quinn led the team to a record breaking 35-game unbeaten streak that culminated in a trip to the 1980 Stanley Cup Finals, where they were upset by the New York Islanders in six games. Quinn won the Jack Adams Award for his effort.  He stayed with the Flyers two more years, but was replaced late in the season during his fourth year.

Los Angeles Kings
Quinn briefly left hockey, but remained in the Philadelphia area to attend law school at Widener University.  In 1984, he was named head coach of the Los Angeles Kings and went on to finish his degree at the University of San Diego.

In his first season back coaching, Quinn returned the Kings to the playoffs after a two-year absence with a 23-point improvement in the standings, but were swept in the opening round by the eventual Stanley Cup champion Edmonton Oilers.  In December 1986, Quinn signed a contract to become the President and General Manager of the Vancouver Canucks for the 1987–88 NHL season while still under contract with the Kings.  Quinn, a lawyer, maintained that the Kings had missed a deadline on an option on his contract, which had a clause allowing him to negotiate with other teams.  NHL President John Ziegler suspended Quinn for the rest of the season and barred him from taking over Vancouver's hockey operations until June.  Ziegler also barred Quinn from coaching anywhere in the NHL until the 1990–91 season. In Ziegler's view, Quinn's actions created a serious conflict of interest that could only be resolved by having him removed as coach.  The Kings tried unsuccessfully to sue the Canucks for tampering.

Vancouver Canucks

Restricted from coaching, Quinn joined the Canucks the following season in 1987–88 as President and General Manager.  He made his first significant transaction, bringing in future franchise goaltender Kirk McLean from the New Jersey Devils along with forward Greg Adams, for centre Patrik Sundström and the Canucks' 1988 fourth-round draft pick (Matt Ruchty), on September 15, 1987.  Quinn continued to make an impact in his first two NHL Entry Drafts, selecting future team captain Trevor Linden second overall in 1988 and Pavel Bure 113th overall in 1989.  Linden went on to become the franchise's all-time leading scorer and have his jersey retired by the Canucks.  Bure, meanwhile, won the Calder Memorial Trophy as league rookie-of-the-year in his first year and recorded three 50-goal seasons with the Canucks and also had his jersey retired.

Bure's selection was highly controversial, however, as Quinn had seemingly chosen him a year ahead of his eligible draft season.  At the age of 18, Bure was available to be chosen in the first three rounds of the draft, but in order to be selected any later than that, he would have had to play in at least two seasons (with a minimum of 11 games per season) for his elite-level European club, the Central Red Army.  The Canucks' head scout at the time, Mike Penny, discovered that Bure had played in additional exhibition and international games to make him an eligible late-round draft choice a year early, however. Quinn originally intended to draft Bure in the eighth round, but after receiving word that the Edmonton Oilers had similar intentions, he selected him in the sixth. Team executives reportedly stormed the Met Center stage in Minnesota, where the draft was being held, protesting the choice immediately following its announcement. The league investigated the selection and originally deemed it illegal. Quinn and the Canucks appealed the decision and it was not until the eve of the 1990 NHL Entry Draft, in which Bure would have been re-entered, that the draft choice was upheld.

In 1991, with the coaching ban lifted, he took over the head coach position with the Canucks for the remaining 26 games of the 1990–91 season. Entering his first full season as Canucks head coach in 1991–92, Quinn met further resistance regarding Bure, who was set to play his rookie season, from the Soviet Ice Hockey Federation. Soviet officials called for Bure's contract with the Central Red Army and the two sides went to court in October 1991 with the Soviets agreeing to a $250,000 settlement.  Quinn signed Bure to a four-year contract soon thereafter, on October 31, worth a reported $2.7 million with an $800,000 signing bonus. Quinn went on to win his second Jack Adams Award as a dramatically improved Canucks squad succeeded in winning the Smythe division.  The Canucks repeated as division champions the following season in 1992–93 before appearing in the 1994 Stanley Cup Finals against the New York Rangers. Despite a lackluster regular season in which the Canucks finished with the seventh seed in their conference, the team that had been entirely built by Quinn got past the Calgary Flames, Dallas Stars and Toronto Maple Leafs in the first three rounds. The Canucks pushed the first-overall Rangers to a seven-game series in the final, but lost the seventh and deciding game.

Following his second Stanley Cup Finals appearance, Quinn gave up his coaching duties to focus on his roles as President and General Manager. In the mid-1990s, the Canucks ownership gradually shifted from the Griffiths family to a new group led by John McCaw Jr. In November 1997, Quinn was fired by the new ownership, with whom Quinn did not see eye-to-eye.

Toronto Maple Leafs

Before the 1998–99 NHL season, Quinn was named head coach of the Toronto Maple Leafs. In his first season, the Maple Leafs improved dramatically, transitioning from a plodding checking team to a speedy scoring team that reached the conference finals, losing to the Buffalo Sabres. He was named a finalist for the Jack Adams Award, and was given the additional duties of General Manager. Quinn took on the General Manager position, reportedly to preempt Leafs President Ken Dryden from hiring his preferred GM which was former Habs teammate Bob Gainey.

Three years later, the Maple Leafs made it to the 2002 Conference Finals, but were eliminated by the Carolina Hurricanes. In August 2003, Quinn was replaced as general manager by John Ferguson Jr., who became the league's youngest general manager at 36, but still retained his coaching duties.

Following the 2004–05 NHL lockout, the Maple Leafs failed to qualify for the playoffs for the first time with Quinn as head coach in 2005–06. As a result, Quinn was fired along with assistant coach and former teammate Rick Ley on April 20, 2006.  The Maple Leafs had suffered season-ending injuries from key players Eric Lindros, Jason Allison, Alex Khavanov and Ed Belfour, all of whom had been signed as free agents by Ferguson the preceding off-season. Despite losing all four players to injury, the Maple Leafs finished the season going 9–1–2 with a younger lineup of prospects, many of whom were drafted by Quinn during his tenure as general manager. Aside from Toronto's lack of success, however, it was speculated that the decision to fire Quinn was a result of friction between him and general manager Ferguson (who denied it), as well as a split in the ownership of Maple Leafs Sports and Entertainment with Ferguson being backed by MLSE Chairman Larry Tannebaum and with Quinn being supported by Ken Thompson (whose Woodbridge holding company had planned to but never did increase its stake in MLSE). Amid speculation of his firing leading up to the official announcement, team captain Mats Sundin and veteran Darcy Tucker had both pledged support for Quinn through the media. Under Quinn, the Maple Leafs had consistently been contenders, recording three 100-point seasons and making the playoffs every season until his last, despite never advancing past the conference finals.

International
At the 2002 Olympic Winter Games in Salt Lake City, Utah, Quinn coached Team Canada to their first Olympic gold medal since 1952, with a 5–2 victory over Team USA in the gold medal game. He subsequently received a standing ovation from the fans in Montreal for his efforts in his first NHL game back from the Olympics.

Two years later, in 2004, Quinn coached Team Canada to victory in the 2004 World Cup with a perfect 6–0 record, capped off by a 3–2 victory over Finland in the final.

Looking to defend their 2002 Olympic gold medal, Hockey Canada chose Quinn once again to coach Team Canada at the 2006 Winter Olympics in Turin. Despite high expectations, Canada went 3–2 through the preliminary round, losing to Switzerland and Finland, both by 2–0 shutouts, then lost to Russia, again by a 2–0 score, in the quarter-finals.

Without an NHL coaching job, having been let go by the Maple Leafs at the end of the 2005–06 season, Quinn was chosen to coach Team Canada at the 2006 Spengler Cup.  They made it to the final game against HC Davos, but lost 3–2.

Two years later, Quinn turned to junior hockey, serving as head coach for Team Canada in the 2008 IIHF World U18 Championships.  He led Canada to the finals against Russia, taking the title by an 8–0 score.  With established success at the junior international level, Quinn was chosen to coach the Canadian under-20 team for the 2009 World Junior Championships as the host country in Ottawa.  He led Canada to an undefeated record in tournament play and a fifth consecutive gold medal, defeating Sweden 5–1 in the final.

Edmonton Oilers
After a three-year absence from the NHL, in which he coached for Team Canada's Spengler Cup, under-18 and junior teams, Quinn was named the head coach of the Edmonton Oilers on May 26, 2009, replacing Craig MacTavish. In his first and ultimately only season as head coach of the Oilers, the team finished in last place in the league with a record of 27–47–8.

Pat Quinn was replaced by Tom Renney as head coach on June 22, 2010, being given the title of Senior Adviser of Hockey Operations for the Oilers, a position he left after the 2010-11 season.

Personal life
Quinn was born in 1943 and grew up in east Hamilton, Ontario.  He was a cousin of former professional wrestler "Big" John Quinn.

Quinn graduated with a B.A. in economics in 1972 from York University in Toronto, Ontario, three years after he began his NHL career with the Toronto Maple Leafs. After retiring from his playing career in 1977, Quinn considered law school, but instead accepted a coaching position with the Philadelphia Flyers.  Nearly five years later, he was fired by the Flyers in time to take the exam for spring acceptance into law school.  Being under contract with the Flyers, his tuition was subsidized by the NHL club.  He earned his J.D. degree from the Widener University School of Law, in Delaware.

Quinn never practiced law, but used his legal knowledge in his executive positions with the Vancouver Canucks and Maple Leafs.

Death
Quinn died at the Vancouver General Hospital in Vancouver on November 23, 2014, following a long battle with illness. He had been unable to attend the 2014 Hockey Hall of Fame induction ceremony on November 17 due to his illness.

Honours and legacy

Honours
Won Memorial Cup with the Edmonton Oil Kings in 1963 (as a player) and Vancouver Giants in 2007 (as a minority owner).
Won Jack Adams Award (NHL coach of the year) in 1980 (Philadelphia Flyers) and 1992 (Vancouver Canucks).
Won Winter Olympic gold medal with Team Canada in 2002 as head coach.
Won World Cup championship with Team Canada in 2004 as head coach.
Won IIHF U18 gold medal with Team Canada in 2008 as head coach.
Won IIHF U20 gold medal with Team Canada in 2009 as head coach.

Legacy
Quinn is credited with popularizing the terms "upper body injury" and "lower body injury" to describe injuries to his players, terms which are now commonplace around the NHL. The term originated during the 1999 Stanley Cup Playoffs when Quinn described an injury sustained to defenceman Dmitri Yushkevich against the Philadelphia Flyers as an "upper body injury". Quinn said he came up with the term "out of the blue" and said he did so because he was tired of having to talk about injuries (as well as worrying about Yushkevich's safety in a physical series). The NHL allows the descriptors as it does not violate league policy against "misleading information" while also maintaining a player's right to privacy over their medical information. Nevertheless, its usage is controversial around the league. In 2018, the Concussion Legacy Foundation stated that the terms provide confusion concerning concussion symptoms, and Ken Hitchcock, then coach of the Dallas Stars, scrapped the practice in favour of specificity because he believed "(the media) knows what the injury is anyway". That same year, Leafs head coach Mike Babcock said he would continue to use the descriptors, because he says it allows "the right people" to work on the injury without "(the media) confusing things", and Washington Capitals forward T.J. Oshie said he prefers the protection because "there are too many idiots who'd target (the injured area)" if they knew about the injury.

Quinn was a member of the committee that determines who is inducted into the Hockey Hall of Fame. In 2013, he was named the Chairman of the committee. He himself was elected to the Hockey Hall of Fame in 2016.

Memorials

On June 9, 2005, the city of Hamilton, Ontario, honoured Quinn at a special ceremony at Parkdale Arena, on the corner of Main Street East and Parkdale Avenue North, where the arena was officially renamed the Pat Quinn Parkdale Arena. On June 8, 2006, Quinn returned to his hometown in Hamilton to accept an honorary Doctor of Laws degree from McMaster University. He addressed the convocation of Social Sciences graduates, saying that "education is a toolbox to make career changes. It is good advice for you to follow your dreams, listen to your heart and obey your passion".

On March 17, 2015, before the NHL game between the Philadelphia Flyers and the Vancouver Canucks, the city of Vancouver, British Columbia officially unveiled the new name of the 700-block of Abbott Street located just outside Rogers Arena to "Pat Quinn Way".

In 2015 Dan Robson wrote a biography on Quinn titled Quinn: The Life of a Hockey Legend.

Career statistics

Regular season and playoffs

Coaching record

References

External links

 
HockeyBuzz.com

1943 births
2014 deaths
Atlanta Flames captains
Atlanta Flames players
Canada men's national ice hockey team coaches
Canadian ice hockey coaches
Canadian ice hockey defencemen
Canadian lawyers
Canadian people of Irish descent
Edmonton Oil Kings (WCHL) players
Edmonton Oilers coaches
Hamilton Tiger Cubs players
Hockey Hall of Fame inductees
Houston Apollos players
Ice hockey people from Ontario
IIHF Hall of Fame inductees
Jack Adams Award winners
Los Angeles Kings coaches
Officers of the Order of Canada
Order of Hockey in Canada recipients
Philadelphia Flyers coaches
Seattle Totems (WHL) players
Sportspeople from Hamilton, Ontario
Toronto Maple Leafs coaches
Toronto Maple Leafs executives
Toronto Maple Leafs players
University of San Diego alumni
Vancouver Canucks coaches
Vancouver Canucks executives
Vancouver Canucks general managers
Vancouver Canucks players
Widener University alumni
York University alumni